Cowichan Secondary is a public high school in Duncan, British Columbia part of School District 79 Cowichan Valley, Opened in 1950. In 2013, the school became a dual-campus Grade 8-12 school after Quamichan Middle School on Beverley Street was merged with Cowichan Secondary on James Street. In September 2018, the Dual Campus model was dissolved and Cowichan Secondary School and Quamichan School returned to being two separate schools, leaving Cowichan Secondary as a grades 10-12 high school.

Location
The school was under construction in the 1940s near the Trans-Canada Highway.

Planning in 2014 considered relocating the school to the property purchased for the school's new build, adjacent to Vancouver Island University's Duncan campus and the Island Savings Centre recreation facility.

In 2019, the Cowichan Secondary School Replacement Project was formally announced. In early January 2021, Urban One Builders and HCMA Architecture + Design were selected to head design and construction, which began later in the year and is currently still in process. The school will prioritize seismic safety and will be three stories tall. The architectural features of the school will honour the unceded Quw’utsun lands where it is situated. The new building will be approximately 11,975 square metres and built for 1100 students, with the ability to expand to house 1500 students with the addition of new classrooms. The construction of the school will cost $82.1 million and is scheduled to be completed in Fall 2023.

Arts
In 2012, Cowichan became the first school in the province of British Columbia to be invited to perform at the International Fringe Festival, the prestigious theatre festival in Edinburgh, Scotland

Sports
Cowichan Senior Secondary has multiple competitive sports teams. These sports include senior and junior girls field hockey, girls rugby, boys rugby, and girls and boys basketball. The most high-achieving team is the girls field hockey team who frequently win provincial championship games. Most of the Senior sports are at the 3A level, except for the volleyball program, which the school is in the process of rebuilding. For the last 4 years, there has been a Junior (Grade 10) team and a Senior girls 4A team.

References

External links
 Official site
School Reports - Ministry of Education
 Class Size
 Satisfaction Survey
 School Performance
 Skills Assessment

Duncan, British Columbia
High schools in British Columbia
School buildings completed in 1950
Educational institutions established in 1948
1948 establishments in British Columbia